Stanikzai (Pashto: ستانکزئی) or Stanizai (Pashto: ستانیزئ) is a subtribe of the Pashtun Ghilji tribe. It is found in Afghanistan mainly in the Kabul, Jalalabad and Logar provinces. Most tribe members speak Pashto and are Sunni Muslims.

The Stanikzai are further subdivided in clans such as the Mir-bash khel, Khushal Khel, Saleh Khel, Tor Khel, Gulmat Khel, Jaber Khel, Rustam Khel and many others.

Pashtun tribes